Alexandra Penney is an American artist, journalist and author.

Biography
Penney was born in Boston, Massachusetts, to Greek-American parents. Upon graduation from Smith College with a BA in Philosophy and MA in Studio Art and Criticism, Penney started her career as a painter with several group shows in New York to her credit. Pressing financial needs as a single mother propelled her into journalism. Her first job was as assistant editor at Vogue, which she left to complete her master's degree in art. She continued to paint and work as a freelancer for various magazines and wrote a weekly column at the New York Times Magazine. She was the author of the best-seller, How to Make Love to a Man, which was on The New York Times best-seller list for over a year. She returned to Conde Nast as editor of Self, where she conceived and created the Pink Ribbon.  With the help of Self editors and the support of her friend and breast cancer survivor, Evelyn Lauder,  propelled the ribbon into an international symbol. During the years she was an author and journalist, Penney continued to paint small-scale work. She returned full-time to art the week after 9/11.

As an artist she has had numerous solo exhibitions in  New York, Germany, and Miami Basel.

Self Magazine and the pink ribbon
As editor of Self magazine, Penney succeeded the founder, Phyllis Starr, who died of breast cancer. Wanting to pay tribute to Starr and knowing that breast cancer was nationally underfunded, Penney, working with Nancy Smith, the executive editor of Self, created the first pink ribbon with SI Newhouse Jr's, (owner of Condé Nast), permission. At a meeting on the same day that the ribbon was created, she called Evelyn Lauder, a friend and breast cancer survivor, to edit the first breast cancer issue of Self and to ask for her help in getting the pink ribbon to Estée Lauder customers.  Lauder, then Sr VP of Estée Lauder,  immediately responded positively and  began to take the pink ribbon global through Estée Lauder sales counters. Lauder and Penney worked  to popularize the ribbon through the magazine and through the Breast Cancer Research Foundation, which was founded by Lauder.  Both Penney and Lauder were commended at the White House by President and Mrs Clinton.

Having been employed by the magazine since 1989, Penney left  in 1994 to assume a role as consultant for start up magazines looking for opportunities in print and new media. Less than a week later Penney announced that she would stay at Self where she wanted to continue the challenge of surpassing the magazines records for advertising revenue and circulation that had been set during her tenure there.

Art

Dominant themes and issues

Flowers

September 11 was a seminal moment for Penney and she quit journalism to once again pursue her career in art. While at Conde Nast she had worked with leading photographers Avedon, Penn, and Newton and decided to change direction by exploring digital photography. Her first New York City solo show at the Julie Lavin Gallery focused on very large-scale digitally manipulated flowers. Flowers have been a continuing theme in her work to date.

Social commentary

The Love Dolls
As she was working with flowers she concurrently photographed cheap plastic blow-up sex dolls. These large-scale color images were a visual report on the role of women and consumerism. They were shown at Miami Basel with the Haas und Fuchs Gallery, and then in a solo show in Berlin. The series World of Women, a result of Penney's ongoing and numerous travels in Europe, Asia, South America, portrays the dolls as subjects of controversial gender issues. In 2010–12, the dolls, in large-scale black and white, depicted drowned or in dire circumstances, were the immediate reaction to her experience as a casualty of Bernard Madoff. They were the subject of a solo show at the Michael Fuchs gallery in New York in 2009. Her latest controversial series, 2013, The Innocents, represent the plastic, overly adorned babies 'born' to the profligate blow-up dolls.

Foreclosures
Penney, working on a book of her Madoff experience, began to photograph foreclosed houses, as visual signifiers of the economic meltdown. The art critic Anthony Haden-Guest, writing in The Art Newspaper, 2010, said "The Foreclosures are starkly beautiful, with saturated color, which makes them more haunting". Penney said "The Foreclosures series will continue as long as houses of the poor are at risk."

How to Make Love to a Man
Her 143-page-long book How to Make Love to a Man became a best-seller in 1981. The book took two years for Penney to research, which included interviewing more than 200 men and reading numerous books, but her biggest challenge was writing it in a tone that would be acceptable to the mass market. Clarkson Potter gave an advance of $75,000 for the book, its largest to that time, but wanted extensive changes after Penney delivered the initial manuscript. The book was published on May 22, 1981, and had sold 130,000 copies within its first five months, and had paperback rights sold to Dell Publishing for $275,000. The book, still in print with over 29 printings, has been translated into 21 languages.

Self magazine
Self magazine's first annual issue for National Breast Cancer Awareness Month came after an April 1991 lunch at the 21 Club, at which Penney discussed ideas for articles about breast cancer with her friend Evelyn Lauder, who was then the Senior Corporate Vice President of the Estée Lauder Companies and was also a member of the board of overseers at the Memorial Sloan-Kettering Cancer Center.

Together with Evelyn Lauder, Penney established The Breast Cancer Research Foundation and formalized the pink ribbon as a symbol for breast cancer awareness as part of Self magazine's second annual Breast Cancer Awareness Month issue in 1992. Penney's inspiration to improve on the success of the magazine's first annual issue was to create a ribbon that would be placed in Estee Lauder's New York City stores. Evelyn Lauder made the commitment to have the ribbons placed on the company's cosmetics counters across the United States.

Having been employed by the magazine since 1989, Penney left Self in July 1994 to assume the position of director of new media development at Condé Nast Publications, in which she would be responsible for developing new opportunities in print and broadcast media for the firm. Less than a week later, Penney announced that she would stay at Self where she wanted to pursue the challenge of surpassing the magazine's records for advertising revenue and circulation that had been set during her tenure at the magazine.

Victim of Madoff scandal
Penney had earned a substantial amount of money from her writing, almost all of which was invested with Bernie Madoff after a good friend steered her to Madoff in the 1990s, assuring her that her money would be safe. As of early 2009, she owned an artist's studio in the SoHo neighborhood of Manhattan, a cottage in West Palm Beach, Florida, and what was described as a "beach shack" in Wainscott, New York, all of which she had paid for over four decades from her earnings. While she did not disclose the amount of her losses at the advice of her lawyers, Penney indicated that she still had enough money in her checking account to last a few months. Penney wrote a series of posts on The Daily Beast titled "The Bag Lady Papers" starting in December 2008 in which she chronicled her experiences and feelings in the wake of the Madoff scandal.

Personal life
Penney lives and works in Manhattan with her partner, artist Dennis Ashbaugh.

References

Year of birth missing (living people)
Living people
American magazine editors
Smith College alumni
American women non-fiction writers
Women magazine editors
Self (magazine) editors
21st-century American women